Abdurrahim Dursun (born 1 December 1998) is a Turkish professional footballer who plays as a left back for Boluspor on loan from Trabzonspor.

Professional career
Dursun made his professional debut for Trabzonspor in a 3-1 UEFA Europa League loss to FC Krasnodar on 7 November 2019.

Honours
Trabzonspor
Turkish Cup: 2019–20

References

External links
 
 
 

1998 births
Living people
People from Bayburt
Turkish footballers
Turkey youth international footballers
Trabzonspor footballers
Bandırmaspor footballers
Boluspor footballers
Süper Lig players
TFF Second League players
TFF First League players
Association football fullbacks